The 2021–22 Persian Gulf Pro League (formerly known as Iran Pro League) is the 39th season of Iran's Football League and 21st as Persian Gulf Pro League since its establishment in 2001. Esteghlal won the league with a record 68-point through an unprecedented unbeaten campaign. The season featured 14 teams from the 2020–21 Persian Gulf Pro League and two new teams promoted from the 2020–21 Azadegan League: Fajr Sepasi and Havadar.

The 2021–22 season will start on 24 September 2021 and end on 20 June 2022.

Teams

Stadia and locations

Number of teams by region

Personnel and kits 
Note: Flags indicate national team as has been defined under FIFA eligibility rules. Players may hold more than one non-FIFA nationality.

Foreign players

The number of foreign players is restricted to four per Persian Gulf Pro League team, including a slot for a player from AFC countries. A team can use four foreign players on the field in each game, including at least one player from the AFC country. 
In bold: Players that have been capped for their national team.

League table

Standings

Results

Positions by round

Statistics

Top scorers 

As of

Hat-tricks

Top assists

As of

Clean sheets
As of

Attendances

Average home attendances

Attendances by round

Notes:Updated to games played on 30 May 2022. Source: Iranleague.ir  Matches with spectator bans are not included in average attendances

Highest attendances

Notes:Updated to games played on 30 May 2022. Source: Iranleague.ir 
1The game was abandoned in the 70th minute after some home fans threw stones. Later the game was scored 0-3 for Persepolis by the disciplinary board.

See also 
 2021–22 Azadegan League
 2021–22 2nd Division
 2021–22 3rd Division
 2021–22 Hazfi Cup
 2021 Iranian Super Cup
 2022 AFC Champions League

References

External links 

Iran Pro League seasons
2021–22 in Iranian football
Iran